Natalia Oleksiyivna Mohylevska, née Mohyla (born 2 August 1975), also known by her stage name Nataliya Mogilevskaya, is a Ukrainian singer, songwriter, composer, actress and TV presenter, producer. National Artist of Ukraine (2004).

She graduated from the nine classes of Kyiv secondary school named after V. I. Kudryashov number 195 in Berezniaky. She graduated from Ukrainian Circus Academy. Soloist and actress of the theaters: the Ukrainian folk theater “Rodina”, the Kyiv House of Actors, the Kyiv Variety Theater, the Jewish Theater “Stern”.

Early Years

1995-1997: Beginning a career 
In 1995 with the support of Yuriy Rybchynskyi began a solo career. At Chervona Ruta, in Simferopol, received a diploma, and for the month gained first place in the "Slavic Bazaar."

In early 1996, Oleksandr Yaholnyk became the new producer of the singer, and pop songs were added to the lyrical drama repertoire. In the summer at the Yalta Festival "Sea of Friends", Mohylevska occupied the second place, giving way to Oleksandr Ponomariov.

In the autumn of 1996 she entered the Kyiv National Institute of Culture and Arts, which graduated from 1999.

In the summer of 1997, Natalia presented her first album, "La la la", which sold millions of copies.

1998-2003: La la la 
Autumn 1998 stopped working with Yaholnyk, independently engaged in production, having entered into a contract on cooperation with "Tavria Games" in February, 1999. The result of the collaboration was the release of an album from their own songs, entitled "Only Me".

In the "Golden Firebird" Award in the "Song" category among the three applicants, two songs from Natalia received prizes: "The Moon" and "Only Me". The "Moon" was recognized as the best song of the year in Ukraine, and Natalia Mohylevska herdelf was the best singer. In the spring of 2000 she began an all-Ukrainian tour with the band. 

In July 2001, Natalia was recognized for the second time in a row as the best singer in Ukraine, for which she received the golden feather. In October, Nova Records released her third CD "Netakaya"

The break with the composer Oleksandr Yaholnyk became critical in her work. The main work of this period was the release of the single "Winter" ("The Plush bear»), clip "Lemon Lantern". The second half of 2003 marked several events at once. The book of the girlfriend of the singer Lada Luzina "Adventures of Natalia Mohylevska and the witches of Ivanna Karamazova" has been published, the prototypes of the main heroes of which were Mohylevska and Luzin himself.

2004-2007: «Send Message» 
In the beginning of 2004, Natalia became the producer and the leading program "Chance" on the TV channel "Inter". In late November, the singer presents the album "The Most ... Most" in the Kyiv club "Dejavu".

In January and December 2005 there is a presentation of clips "You know" and "There is no truth in the words". In May 2005, she participated in the annual Tavria Games festival.

In 2006, Natalia hosted a presentation of the Ukrainian-language album "Send a Message". That same year, she and her partner, Vlad Yama, took part in the TV project "Dancing with the Stars", where she won the second place and the first place in the Star Duo project (along with the producer of "Chances" Ihor Kondratiuk).

2007 - filming a clip for the song "This dance", presentation of the same name album and the eponymous tour of the country, along with a partner on "Dances ..." by Vladyslav Yama. Solo concert in Kyiv within the framework of the tour "This dance". In autumn, Natalia and Vlad took part in the third season of "Dancing with the Stars", where they again took second place.

In June 2007, she announced the release of the "Chance" program, where she had been leading for 10 years. However, after switching the project to the 1 + 1 TV channel, Mohylevska returned to the project with which she successfully cooperated in 2008.

2008-2012: Star Factories 
In the summer of 2008, the Novyi Kanal invited Natalia Mohylevska to become the music producer of the second season of the "Factory of Stars". 

After the huge success of the Factory of Stars - 3, produced by Konstantin Meladze, the New Channel launched a grand project "Factory of Stars. Superfinal ", in which one of the members of the jury was Natalia Mohylevska (except for her - the director general of the" New Channel "Irina Lysenko and producer Konstantin Meladze).

In 2010, on TV channel "1 + 1" the teleproject "Star + Star" was launched. Mohylevska became a co-host of the show with Yuriy Horbunov.

2013-2018: "Tantsi z zirkamy (season 5)" 
In 2013, Natalia presented a mini-album "On-Line Project", which included 6 songs.

On February 1, 2015, Natalia took part in the filming of the second season of the vocal show "Voice Children "as coach.  On October 11, 2015, the premiere of the children's talent show "Little Giants" took place on the TV channel "1 + 1" where she was a member of the jury.

In 2017, along with Monatik released a Russian-language single "Ya zavelas"  On August 27, on the TV channel "1 + 1", a premiere of the fourth season of "Dancing with the Stars" was held, where Natalia offered a court seat, but she refused and in return became a party.  Couple with Ihor Kuzmenko, she won.  In November, Natalia became the coach of the Voice of Children vocal show for the second time.

Albums 

 1997: "La la la"
 1998: "Snowdrop"
 1999: "Only Me"
 2001: "Netakaya"
 2002: "Winter"
 2003: "The best… The best"
 2006: "Send Message"
 2007: "This Dance"
 2008: "Loved"
 2013: "On-line Project"

Celebs and awards 

April 19, 2001 was awarded the title "Honored Artist of Ukraine". 
On December 29, 2004, the President of Ukraine Leonid Kuchma granted the honorary title of "National Artist of Ukraine" with a separate decree for his significant personal contribution to the development of Ukrainian song art, high performing skills. Natalia Mohylevska
In 2011, she was nominated for the YUNA Award in the category "Best Performer" for her achievements in music for 20 years.

Notes

References

External links 

 

1975 births
Living people
Musicians from Kyiv
20th-century Ukrainian women singers
Ukrainian pop singers
Television presenters from Kyiv
Recipients of the title of Merited Artist of Ukraine
Recipients of the title of People's Artists of Ukraine
Fabrika Zvyozd
21st-century Ukrainian women singers
Russian-language singers
Ukrainian women television presenters